The Zhecheng Cultural Park is a multi-purpose park in Gongchang Village, Lioujiao Township, Chiayi County, Taiwan.

History
The park was originally the area of Suantou Sugar Factory which was built in 1906 as one of the three largest sugar factory in Taiwan at that time. In September 2001, the factory was damaged by Typhoon Nari which caused the sugar production a complete halt due to the damaged machines.

Events
The park regularly hold exhibitions.

Transportation
The park is accessible northwest from Chiayi Station of Taiwan High Speed Rail (THSR). In 2017, the government planned to extend the Taiwan Sugar Railways from THSR Chiayi Station to the park and also the Southern Branch of the National Palace Museum.

See also
 List of tourist attractions in Taiwan

References

External links

 

1906 establishments in Taiwan
Buildings and structures in Chiayi County
Sugar refineries in Taiwan